Amalda lineata is a species of sea snail, a marine gastropod mollusc in the family Ancillariidae.

Description

Distribution

References

lineata
Gastropods described in 1844